Cristina Pardo Virto (Pamplona, Navarre, July 5, 1977) is a Spanish journalist and television presenter.

Education 
Pardo studied journalism in the University of Navarra in Spain.

Career 
Pardo started working with Antonio Herrero in the radio program La Mañana in Cadena COPE.

In 2006 she started to work in the news program La Sexta Noticias in the political section, covering the information about the People's Party. During the Holy Week of 2013 she was the replacement of Antonio García Ferreras in the political debate program Al rojo vivo in La Sexta.

Since June 2014 she appears in the radio program A vivir que son dos días in Cadena SER, with a political section.

In April and November 2017 she was the host of the documentary series about political corruption Malas compañías: Historias anónimas de la corrupción in La Sexta.

Since April 2018 she is the host of the interviews and current news program Liarla Pardo in La Sexta.

References

1977 births
Living people
Spanish radio presenters
Spanish women radio presenters
Spanish television presenters
Spanish women television presenters
Spanish women journalists
21st-century journalists
University of Navarra alumni
People from Pamplona
Spanish radio journalists